Junonia grisea, the gray buckeye or grey buckeye, is a species in the butterfly family Nymphalidae. It is found in North America, west of the Rocky Mountains. Like the common buckeye, the gray buckeye is a brown butterfly with eyespots on its wings that distract predators from its body.

Junonia grisea was formerly considered a subspecies of the common buckeye, Junonia coenia, called Junonia coenia grisea. The gray buckeye's status as a separate species was discovered in 2018 by Dr. Jeffrey Marcus, an entomologist at the University of Manitoba, and Melanie Lalonde, a graduate student. As a result, Junonia grisea is now found mainly west of the Rocky Mountains.

References

Further reading

 

Junonia
Butterflies described in 1998